The 2018–19 NHL season was the 102nd season of operation (101st season of play) of the National Hockey League. 31 teams competed in an 82-game regular season. The regular season began on October 3, 2018, and ended on April 6, 2019. The 2019 Stanley Cup playoffs began on April 10, 2019, and the Stanley Cup Finals concluded on June 12, 2019, with the St. Louis Blues winning their first Stanley Cup in the Finals over the Boston Bruins in seven games.

League business

Salary cap
On June 21, 2018, the National Hockey League Players' Association announced that the salary cap would be set at $79.5 million per team for the 2018–19 season.

Rule changes
No major rule changes have been implemented this season.

On-ice ads in the rink corners
After a trial during the 2018 All-Star Game and China games, the NHL began to allow teams to sell on-ice advertising placements in the corners of the rink. NHL chief revenue officer Keith Wachtel estimated that these new placements could provide up to $10 million in additional revenue to teams per season. During the playoffs, these advertising areas will be controlled by the league.

Sports betting
On October 29, 2018, it was announced that MGM Resorts International would become the NHL's "official sports wagering partner" in the United States. This deal includes direct access to new forms of internal statistics data, as well as brand licensing agreements in relation to its sportsbooks, and came in the wake of a court ruling earlier in the year which declared the Professional and Amateur Sports Protection Act of 1992 (a U.S. law that forbade the legalization of sports betting outside of Nevada and other exempted states) to be unconstitutional.

Expansion
On December 4, 2018, NHL Commissioner Gary Bettman officially announced that the league had approved an expansion team in Seattle, later christened the Seattle Kraken, which is planned to begin play in the 2021–22 season. To accommodate the addition in 2021, the new team will be placed in the Pacific Division, while the Arizona Coyotes will be moved to the Central Division.

Media rights
This was the eighth season under the NHL's ten year U.S. rights deal with NBC Sports and fifth season of its twelve year Canadian rights deals with Sportsnet and TVA Sports.

Through BAMTech's prior 2015 agreement to run NHL.tv and the league's other digital properties, the subscription streaming service ESPN+ began offering up to 180 regular season games.

On December 20, 2017, CBC Television and Rogers Communications struck an agreement to renew its sublicensing agreement for Hockey Night in Canada through the end of Rogers's current broadcast contract. The two sides had previously reached an agreement to extend its original four-year agreement by an additional year. Rogers announced the retirement of long-time commentator Bob Cole from Hockey Night, after calling a limited schedule of games.

Three teams shifted their radio broadcast rights exclusively to internet radio, all of which in heavily crowded large media markets with multiple sports teams seeking a limited number of radio outlets. The Los Angeles Kings "Audio Network" will now be exclusively carried on iHeartRadio. The New Jersey Devils and New York Islanders have a broadcast agreement with Entercom for the New York City market that will see only a limited number of games broadcast on their flagship sports station, WFAN, with the rest being carried on the company's Radio.com platform (the university radio station WRHU remains the Islanders' radio flagship). WFAN had already carried only a limited number of games from those teams in recent seasons, previously pawning off the remainder on other non-sports stations such as WNYM.

In an effort to expand the league's television audience in Europe, the NHL began to schedule more weekend afternoon games (the "European Game of the Week") so they could air live during the primetime hours. The initiative launched with an NHL Global Series game in Gothenburg, Sweden, on October 6, 2018.

Draft
The 2018 NHL Entry Draft was held June 22 and 23, 2018. The Buffalo Sabres, by virtue of winning the draft lottery on April 28, held the first overall selection, using it to select defenceman Rasmus Dahlin.

Preseason games in China
Two preseason games were played in China. The Calgary Flames and Boston Bruins played one game (Calgary as home team) at the Shenzhen Universiade Sports Center in Shenzhen on September 15, 2018, and played another (Boston as home team) at Cadillac Arena in Beijing on September 19, 2018.

Preseason games in Europe
Two preseason games were played in Europe. The New Jersey Devils played against SC Bern at PostFinance Arena in Bern, Switzerland, on October 1, 2018. The Edmonton Oilers played against Kölner Haie at Lanxess Arena in Cologne, Germany, on October 3, 2018.

Coaching changes

(*) Indicates interim.

Front office changes

Arena changes
 The New York Islanders moved half of their home schedule back to their previous home, the Nassau Veterans Memorial Coliseum, after the Barclays Center proved to be unsuitable as a full-time NHL venue. The Islanders continue to play the remaining half of their home schedule at the Barclays Center, an arrangement that will last until 2021, when Belmont Park Arena is scheduled to open. In the Stanley Cup playoffs, the Islanders played their first round home games at the Nassau Coliseum and their second round home games at the Barclays Center.
 The St. Louis Blues' home arena was renamed from Scottrade Center to Enterprise Center on July 1, 2018.
 The Toronto Maple Leafs' home arena was renamed from the Air Canada Centre to Scotiabank Arena on July 1, 2018.

Regular season
The regular season began on October 3, 2018, and ended April 6, 2019. This season, the mandatory "bye week" that each team received was extended from five to seven days, to also include All-Star Weekend. The regular season schedule was released on June 21.

International games
Three regular season games, branded as the NHL Global Series, were played in Europe. The Edmonton Oilers and New Jersey Devils played at the Scandinavium in Gothenburg, Sweden, on October 6, 2018. The Florida Panthers and Winnipeg Jets played two games at Hartwall Arena in Helsinki, Finland, on November 1 and 2, 2018.

Outdoor games

 The Winter Classic was held on January 1, 2019, at Notre Dame Stadium in South Bend, Indiana, and featured the Chicago Blackhawks and the Boston Bruins.
 The NHL Stadium Series was held on February 23, 2019, at Lincoln Financial Field in Philadelphia, Pennsylvania, and featured the Pittsburgh Penguins and the Philadelphia Flyers.

All–Star Game

The 2019 National Hockey League All-Star Game was held in San Jose, California, at SAP Center, home of the San Jose Sharks, on January 26, 2019, the first time it was held on a Saturday after many years of the All-Star game being played on a Sunday.

Standings

Tie Breakers:
1. Fewer number of games played
2. Greater Regulation + OT Wins (ROW)
3. Greatest number of points earned in head-to-head play (If teams played an uneven number of head-to-head games, the result of the first game on the home ice of the team with the extra home game is discarded.)
4. Greater Goal differential

Playoffs

Bracket

Statistics

Scoring leaders
The following players led the league in regular season points at the conclusion of games played on April 6, 2019.

Leading goaltenders
The following goaltenders led the league in regular season goals against average at the conclusion of games played on April 6, 2019, while playing at least 1,800 minutes.

NHL awards

The league's awards were presented at the NHL Awards ceremony, that was held following the 2019 Stanley Cup playoffs on June 19 at the Mandalay Bay Events Center. Finalists for voted awards were announced during the playoffs and winners were presented at the award ceremony. Voting concluded immediately after the end of the regular season. The Presidents' Trophy, the Prince of Wales Trophy and Clarence S. Campbell Bowl are not presented at the awards ceremony. The Lester Patrick Trophy is announced during the summer and presented in the fall.

All-Star teams

Milestones

First games

The following is a list of notable players who played their first NHL game during the 2018–19 season, listed with their first team. Asterisk(*) marks debut in playoffs.

Last games

Major milestones reached

 On October 3, 2018, Montreal Canadiens forward Jesperi Kotkaniemi became the first player born in the 2000s to play in one of the four major professional sports leagues in the United States and Canada.
 On October 13, 2018, Chicago Blackhawks defenceman Duncan Keith played his 1,000th game, becoming the 323rd player to reach the mark.
 On October 15, 2018, Montreal Canadiens forward Tomas Plekanec played his 1,000th game, becoming the 324th player to reach the mark.
 On October 16, 2018, Edmonton Oilers forward Connor McDavid broke his first NHL record, by contributing to, either by scoring or assisting on all of the first nine goals scored by his team in the regular season. The record was previously held by Adam Oates, who contributed to the first seven goals scored by the Detroit Red Wings in 1986–87.
 On October 19, 2018, Minnesota Wild forward Eric Staal played his 1,100th game.
 On October 25, 2018, Minnesota Wild defenceman Ryan Suter played his 1,000th game, becoming the 325th player to reach the mark.
 On October 30, 2018, Dallas Stars forward Jason Spezza played his 1,000th game, becoming the 326th player to reach the mark.
 On November 1, 2018, Buffalo Sabres forward Jason Pominville played his 1,000th game, becoming the 327th player to reach the mark.
 On November 1, 2018, Toronto Maple Leafs defenceman Ron Hainsey played his 1,000th game, becoming the 328th player to reach the mark.
 On November 8, 2018, San Jose Sharks forward Joe Thornton played his 1,500th game, becoming the 19th player to reach the mark.
 On November 17, 2018, Los Angeles Kings defenceman Dion Phaneuf played his 1,000th game, becoming the 329th player to reach the mark.
 On November 17, 2018, New York Rangers goaltender Henrik Lundqvist recorded his 438th win, surpassing Jacques Plante for seventh place in wins.
 On November 21, 2018, Nashville Predators goaltender Pekka Rinne recorded his 320th win, surpassing Miikka Kiprusoff for the most wins by a Finnish-born goaltender.
 On December 15, 2018, Montreal Canadiens head coach Claude Julien got his 600th win, becoming the 18th coach in league history to reach the mark.
 On December 20, 2018, Montreal Canadiens goaltender Carey Price recorded his 300th win, becoming the 35th goaltender to reach the mark.
 On December 23, 2018, Detroit Red Wings defenceman Trevor Daley played his 1,000th game, becoming the 330th player to reach the mark.
 On December 27, 2018, San Jose Sharks defenceman Brent Burns played his 1,000th game, becoming the 331st player to reach the mark.
 On January 4, 2019, Detroit Red Wings forward Thomas Vanek played his 1,000th game, becoming the 332nd player to reach the mark.
 On January 5, 2019, Los Angeles Kings goaltender Jonathan Quick recorded his 300th win, becoming the 36th goaltender to reach the mark.
 On January 10, 2019, Columbus Blue Jackets head coach John Tortorella got his 600th win, becoming the 19th and the first United States-born coach to reach the mark.
 On January 14, 2019, Washington Capitals defenceman Brooks Orpik played his 1,000th game, becoming the 333rd player to reach the mark.
 On January 21, 2019, Nashville Predators head coach Peter Laviolette got his 600th win, becoming the 20th and the second United States-born coach to reach the mark.
 On February 3, 2019, Boston Bruins goaltender Tuukka Rask earned his 253rd win, becoming the goaltender with most wins in Bruins franchise history.
 On February 5, 2019, Boston Bruins forward Patrice Bergeron played his 1,000th game, becoming the 334th player to reach the mark.
 On February 5, 2019, Washington Capitals forward Alexander Ovechkin scored his 1,180 point, surpassing Sergei Fedorov to become the leading Russia-born scorer in NHL history.
 On February 5, 2019, Winnipeg Jets head coach Paul Maurice coached his 1,500th game, becoming the sixth coach and the youngest in NHL history to reach the mark.
 On February 9, 2019, Montreal Canadiens goaltender Carey Price played his 600th game, becoming the 49th goaltender to reach the mark.
 On February 14, 2019, Chicago Blackhawks forward Chris Kunitz played his 1,000th game, becoming the 335th player to reach the mark.
 On February 14, 2019, San Jose Sharks forward Joe Thornton surpassed Teemu Selanne for 15th on the NHL's all-time scoring leaders list
 On February 19, 2019, Ottawa Senators goaltender Craig Anderson played his 600th game, becoming the 50th goaltender to reach the mark.
 On March 1, 2019, the Philadelphia Flyers set an NHL record by using eight goaltenders in one season (Brian Elliott, Calvin Pickard, Michal Neuvirth, Alex Lyon, Anthony Stolarz, Carter Hart, Mike McKenna and Cam Talbot).
 On March 5, 2019, Anaheim Ducks forward Ryan Kesler played his 1,000th game, becoming the 336th player to reach the mark.
 On March 5, 2019, New York Islanders head coach Barry Trotz got his 800th win, becoming the fourth coach to reach the mark.
 On March 5, 2019, Pittsburgh Penguins forward Matt Cullen played his 1,500th game, becoming the 20th player to reach the mark.
 On March 5, 2019, the Tampa Bay Lightning became the first team in NHL history to have multiple goaltenders (Andrei Vasilevskiy and Louis Domingue), each with a winning streak of 10 or more games in a season.
 On March 11, 2019, the Tampa Bay Lightning became the seventh team in NHL history to have 110 points through 70 games.
 On March 12, 2019, Montreal Canadiens goaltender Carey Price recorded his 315th win, surpassing Jacques Plante to become the goaltender with most wins in Canadiens franchise history.
 On March 12, 2019, Pittsburgh Penguins forward Evgeni Malkin scored his 1,000th point, becoming the 88th player to reach the mark.
 On March 21, 2019, Tampa Bay Lightning head coach Jon Cooper earned his 300th win in his 500th game.
 On March 28, 2019, Los Angeles Kings goaltender Jonathan Quick played his 600th game, becoming the 51st goaltender to reach the mark.
 On April 1, 2019, Los Angeles Kings forward Anze Kopitar played his 1,000th game, becoming the 337th player to reach the mark.
 On April 5, 2019, Washington Capitals forward Alexander Ovechkin won the eighth Maurice "Rocket" Richard Trophy of his career, surpassing Phil Esposito to become the player with the most goal-scoring titles in NHL history.
 On April 6, 2019, San Jose Sharks head coach Peter DeBoer got his 400th win, becoming the 38th head coach to reach the mark.
 On April 6, 2019, Tampa Bay Lightning forward Nikita Kucherov scored his 128th point, surpassing Alexander Mogilny to become the Russian-born leading scorer in a single season.

Uniforms
 The Anaheim Ducks wore a new third jersey inspired by the uniforms from their years as the Mighty Ducks of Anaheim from 1993 to 2006.
 The Arizona Coyotes wore the "Kachina" jersey as the team's new third uniform. They previously used this design for road games from 1996 to 2003.
 The Calgary Flames wore their 2009–2013 and 2016–17 third jersey, which is a throwback to their red jersey used from 1980 to 1994.
 The Carolina Hurricanes wore a new black third jersey, which was inspired by the third uniform used from 2008 to 2017. The team also announced that they would wear a heritage uniform on two occasions versus the Boston Bruins, which was inspired by the jerseys worn by their predecessor, the Hartford Whalers, from 1985 to 1989 and during the 1990–91 season. The goal song "Brass Bonanza" and Pucky the Whale from the Hartford Whalers also appeared in the games. 
 The Colorado Avalanche wore a new third jersey, which was inspired by the third uniform used during the 2015–16 season.
 The Columbus Blue Jackets wore a third jersey, which was worn from 2010 to 2017.
 The Edmonton Oilers wore their 2010–2017 home jerseys as their alternate uniform this season dubbed the "retro jersey". It will be used four times this season.
 The Los Angeles Kings wore silver third jerseys, inspired by the uniforms worn during the 2016–17 season as part of their 50th anniversary, with gold accents being changed to silver.
 The New Jersey Devils, who had worn red heritage jerseys with their original 1982 red and green design in select games from 2010-2017, introduced a new white heritage jersey, to be worn in four games.
 The New York Islanders wore new blue third jerseys, partially inspired by their third jersey from the 2014–15 season.
 The Ottawa Senators wore red third jerseys, which were worn during the NHL 100 Classic.
 The Philadelphia Flyers wore black third jerseys, which were worn in the 2017 Stadium Series.
 The Pittsburgh Penguins wore third jerseys inspired by the uniforms worn by the team in the 1980s and during the 2017 Stadium Series.
 The San Jose Sharks wore new black third jerseys, dubbed the "Stealth" jersey, during select home games.
 The St. Louis Blues wore third jerseys, which are based on the uniforms worn during the 2017 Winter Classic.
 The Tampa Bay Lightning wore new black third jerseys during select home games.
 The Washington Capitals brought back their 2015-2017 third jerseys, which are based on the uniforms worn from 1974 to 1995.
 The Winnipeg Jets wore a new "aviator blue" third jersey featuring a script wordmark, and striping inspired by the uniforms worn by the original Winnipeg Jets from 1990 to 1996. Additionally, the team announced they would wear heritage uniforms previously worn during the 2016 NHL Heritage Classic.

See also
 2018–19 NHL transactions
 2018–19 NHL suspensions and fines
 List of 2018–19 NHL Three Star Awards
 2018 in sports
 2019 in sports

References

External links
 2018–19 NHL season schedule

 
1
1